Bone Creek may refer to one of the following places:

 Bone Creek (Long Pine Creek tributary), a stream in Brown County, Nebraska
 Bone Creek (New York), a tributary of Oquaga Creek in Broome County
 Bone Creek (West Virginia), a stream in Ritchie County
 Bone Creek Township, Butler County, Nebraska
 Rural Municipality of Bone Creek No. 108, Saskatchewan, Canada